The Portrait of Doge Pietro Loredan is a painting by the Italian Renaissance master Jacopo Robusti, more commonly known as Tintoretto. It was painted in around 1567–1570, while Pietro Loredan reigned as the Doge of Venice. It is on display at the Kimbell Art Museum in Fort Worth, Texas.

Description
The subject, Doge Pietro Loredan, is portrayed in gold brocade, fur robe, cape with golden buttons, and the distinct corno ducale, a symbol of the Doge of Venice.

References

16th-century paintings
Portraits of men
Paintings by Tintoretto
Paintings in the collection of the Kimbell Art Museum